WWII GI is a first-person shooter video game set during the events of World War II. Developed by TNT Team and published by GT Interactive, the game was released in 1999 as the direct sequel to NAM, which was released the year prior. WWII GI was the last commercially released game to use the Build engine until the release of Ion Fury in 2019. The player takes control of 101st Airborne Division G.I. Corporal Gerardi, sent in to wipe out scores of Wehrmacht and Schutzstaffel soldiers. WWII GI was later re-released on Steam on November 13, 2015, with Retroism and Night Dive Studios as the publishers.

Gameplay 
The game sets the player in the middle of World War II scenarios such as the D-Day beach landings during the invasion of Normandy, assaults on equipment and supply depots, and other scenarios. The game consists of 30 levels divided into four episodes; there are two single-player episodes with seven levels in each episode and two multiplayer episodes with eight levels in each episode. The game was built using the Build engine, with 3D environments and 2D character sprites. It shared similar gameplay elements to its predecessor, NAM.

Reception 

The game received "mixed" reviews according to the review aggregation website GameRankings. IGN felt that the game was not keeping up with the rest of the market and was using an outdated engine and was too obsolete.

References

External links 
 

1999 video games
Build (game engine) games
Cooperative video games
DOS games
Linux games
Multiplayer and single-player video games
Multiplayer null modem games
Video games developed in the United States
Video games with 2.5D graphics
Video games with digitized sprites
Windows games
World War II video games
Sprite-based first-person shooters